Lan Mu (1872–1943) was from Dabu, Chaozhou of Guangdong Province. He was a famous craftsman of traditional architecture in Taiwan and Penghu during 1916 to 1943. According to the area of his hometown, he might be a Hakka.

Biography 
Lan Mu's parents died in his early years and he went to be a craftsman's apprentice to raise himself and his younger brother Lan He. Based on his hard work and talent, he became a good wood carving master in Chaozhou.

In 1916, (Taishō 5th year), Lan Mu left his hometown and moved to Penghu with his brother. In 1923, (Taishō 11th year), when Lan Mu was 40 years old (as the East Asian age reckoning), he was surprisingly assigned to be the chief architect of Penghu Mazu Temple repair work in a young age. Three years later, Lan Mu and other craftsmen successfully finished the repair.

Penghu Mazu Temple was the most important work in Lan Mu's career. In addition to Mazu Temple, Lan Mu took part in other repair works, such as Beiji Temple and Beichen Temple, both located at Magong City. Beiji Temple was destroyed by the America Air Force during World War II and Beichen Temple was dismantled and rebuilt in 1981.

Lan Mu also had a printing factory in Penghu. His descendants took it over until the present.

Gallery 
Lee Chien-Lang (李乾朗 in Chinese), a Taiwaness traditional architecture investigator, speaks very highly of Lan Mu's works. Moreover, because Lan Mu was from Guangdong, he was different from most of craftsmen in Taiwan main island who were from Fujian. His shape pattern and the decorations had a unique style; he preferred square pillars, and the carving work he did was much finer.

References 

1872 births
1943 deaths
Qing dynasty people
Hakka
Taiwanese carpenters
Taiwanese architects
People from Penghu County
20th-century architects